Not of This Earth is an independently made 1957 American black-and-white science fiction film produced and directed by Roger Corman (for his Los Altos Productions), that stars Paul Birch, Beverly Garland, Morgan Jones, William Roerick, and Anna Lee Carroll. The film was written by Charles B. Griffith and Mark Hanna and was distributed by Allied Artists Pictures Corporation as a double feature with Attack of the Crab Monsters. Its theatrical release had a running time of 67 minutes, that was expanded to 70 minutes in 1962 for TV syndication.

The storyline concerns the attempts by an extraterrestrial humanoid to surreptitiously secure the blood of humans and to test it on himself as a treatment for a fatal blood disorder which is ravaging the population of his home planet, Davanna.

Plot
A man who is "not of this Earth" (Paul Birch) has adopted the name "Mr. Johnson" for moving among the populace of Los Angeles. The alien has a sensitivity to high-decibel sounds and is conspicuous only for his stilted and formal syntax and his sunglasses, which he wears even in the dark. The sunglasses hide his blank, white-eyed stare which kills his victims by burning through their eyes and into their brains. He removes the blood of his first victim (a teenage girl walking home at night from a date) using a system of tubes and canisters that he keeps in an aluminum attaché case.

Johnson is from the planet Davanna, where the inhabitants have developed an incurable blood disease as a side effect from a nuclear war, and he has been sent to Earth to examine the blood of humans for its possible usefulness in curing Davanna's dying race (their blood is slowly turning to dust in their veins). Johnson is answerable to an authority on Davanna with whom he can communicate through a device hidden behind a sliding panel in the living room of his Griffith Park mansion. His bodyguard, Jeremy (Jonathan Haze), who also acts as his chauffeur and houseboy, provides him support and protection, but is unaware of his being a murderous alien.

Johnson hires nurse Nadine (Beverly Garland) to look after him in his house. Her boss, town physician Dr. Rochelle (William Roerick), is under Johnson's hypnotic control after finding out about his patient's peculiar blood cell structure. With a limit on the number of transfusions he can be given, Johnson takes to murdering locals and simply draining their blood. Adding to his victims are a strolling Chinese-American man, a sleazy door-to-door vacuum cleaner salesman (Dick Miller), and a trio of homeless male drunkards. The police are mystified by these "vampire killings".

Johnson's plans are disturbed by the unexpected and sudden appearance of a female from Davanna (Anna Lee Carroll). While Johnson can command Earth humans through telepathy, even to the point of using their native languages, he can also completely communicate with his fellow aliens through telepathy. The alien female asks him for an immediate transfusion, because her physical condition is rapidly deteriorating. Johnson breaks into Rochelle's office, but by accident he steals blood contaminated with rabies.

Later, the Davanna woman collapses in the street, dying at a hospital. Nadine's friend, police patrolman Harry Sherbourne (Morgan Jones), tries to question Dr. Rochelle about the dead woman, but he is unable to speak while under Johnson's mind control. As a precaution, now fearing discovery, Johnson sends a bizarre oxygen-activated umbrella-like flying alien creature to kill Rochelle (nicknamed the "jellyfish monster" by special effects man Paul Blaisdell). He eradicates Jeremy, who has discovered evidence of Johnson's alien origin. Nadine, whom he attempts to kidnap and take with him, manages to call the police as Johnson chases her through the park in his car. Johnson abandons her and flees, pursued by the arriving Sherbourne on his motorcycle. When Sherbourne turns on his siren, Johnson (to whom the sound is immensely painful) loses control of his car and dies in a crash.

After Johnson's burial, Sherbourne and Nadine stand by his grave, which bears the inscription "Here lies a man who was not of this Earth". While Sherbourne expresses mild compassion for Johnson, for his motivation to rescue his world and its dying populace, Nadine refuses to offer any kind of pity. They leave, just as a mysterious man, wearing dark sunglasses, approaches the grave site. Like Johnson, he wears the same sunglasses and carries the same distinctive case containing transfusion equipment.

Cast
 Paul Birch as Paul Johnson
 Beverly Garland as Nadine Storey
 Morgan Jones as Harry Sherbourne
 William Roerick as Dr. F.W. Rochelle
 Jonathan Haze as Jeremy Perrin
 Roy Engel as Desk Sergeant
 Dick Miller as Joe Piper, vacuum cleaner salesman
 Anna Lee Carroll as Davanna Woman

Production
Griffith said that after he and Corman had collaborated on the film Gunslinger, he suggested they make a science fiction film and Corman agreed; Not of This Earth was the result. He also said he originally wrote the part of the vacuum cleaner salesman for himself.

Griffth said the film "started all this X-ray eye business. Most of Roger's themes got established right in the beginning. Whatever worked, he'd come and take again, and a lot of things got used over and over. During the production of Not of This Earth, I was married to a nurse, and she helped me do a lot of medical research. I remember how we cured cancer in that script. Somehow the film was a mess when it was finished".

Paul Birch complained bitterly about having to wear the white contact lenses for so many hours during filming. Roger Corman wanted him ready to roll on a moment's notice, so he asked him to leave the contact lenses in his eyes all day long, which caused Birch extreme discomfort. Birch and Corman wound up getting into a shoving match on the set, and Birch actually walked out on the production before it was finished. Corman had to use a double (wearing Birch's dark glasses and slouch hat) to finish the few scenes Birch had not completed.

Props and locations
Griffith said, "Paul Birch was supposed to wear wraparound glasses, so you couldn't see the sides of his eyes. They stuck gaffer's tape on the sides of his glasses. You can see it if you look. In that film, I was in the scene at the newsstand at Las Palmas".

The exterior of Johnson's house was at 1725 Camino Palermo in Hollywood; it has since been replaced by a block of apartment buildings. The car that Johnson uses is a 1955 Cadillac Fleetwood Series 75 limousine. Dr. Rochelle's office exterior is the now-demolished Hollywood Receiving Hospital, which was located at 1350 North Wilcox Avenue in Hollywood.

Release
Not of This Earth was released in the United States on the bottom half of a double bill with Corman's Attack of the Crab Monsters. According to Tim Dirks, the film was one of a wave of "cheap teen movies" released for the drive-in market. They consisted of "exploitative, cheap fare created especially for them [teens] in a newly-established teen/drive-in genre".

Griffith said that the double bill of Not of this Earth and Attack of the Crab Monsters made a 400% profit in its first week.

Some release prints of Not of This Earth run 71 minutes instead of the regular 67 minute running time; these include duplicate scenes that the film's distributor added to the film to lengthen it a bit. Example: a dialogue between Johnson and a representative from Davanna, which appears as a pre-title sequence, is reused again some minutes into the film. This release version has circulated in syndication on U.S. TV stations, 16 mm prints, bootleg videotape, and DVDs.

Reception
Geoff Andrew in his Time Out review said "Low budgets give little reason for regret when the often tacky effects are surrounded by so much imagination, good humour, and sheer joy in film-making as here. Not of This Earth is a minor sci-fi gem, with an alien (Birch; you can tell he's an ET by his briefcase and dark glasses, establishing him as infinitely superior to the moronic middle Americans on view) terrorising Earth (or a small backlot) in his quest for blood for the folks back home".

Michael Weldon in The Psychotronic Encyclopedia of Film called the film, "Corman's most enjoyable science fiction film". The Aurum Film Encyclopedia – Science Fiction said Not of This Earth was "Marvellous".

Lexikon des Science Fiction Films said this about the film: "[…] although not necessarily first rank, [Not of This Earth] still belongs, bearing its low budget in mind, to the best science fiction films of the Fifties".

Remakes
 Not of This Earth (1988), directed by Jim Wynorski and starring Traci Lords.
 Not of This Earth  (1995), directed by Terence H. Winkless and starring Michael York.

Home media
Not of this Earth was released in the United States as a regular DVD, a part of the Roger Corman's Cult Classics Triple Feature DVD box set, and in the United Kingdom as a single DVD. Foreign DVD releases exist in Spain (as Emisario del otro mundo) and Germany (as Die Außerirdischen).

See also
 List of American films of 1957
 Vampire film

Notes

References

Bibliography

 Hardy, Phil, ed. Science Fiction: The Aurum Film Encyclopedia, Vol. 2. London: William Morrow & Co., 1991. .
 Pym, John, ed. "Not of This Earth". Time Out Film Guide. London: Time Out Guides Limited, 2004. .
 Warren, Bill. Keep Watching the Skies: American Science Fiction Films of the 1950s, 21st Century Edition. Jefferson, North Carolina" McFarland & Company, 2009. .

External links

 
 
Review of film at Variety

1957 films
1950s science fiction films
1950s teen films
American science fiction films
Films about extraterrestrial life
Films directed by Roger Corman
American vampire films
Films produced by Roger Corman
Films with screenplays by Charles B. Griffith
Allied Artists films
Films scored by Ronald Stein
Films shot in Los Angeles
1950s English-language films
1950s American films